The Women's Giant Slalom competition in the 2016 FIS Alpine Skiing World Cup consisted of nine events, including the World Cup finals in St. Moritz, Switzerland. 

Before the start of the season, two-time defending discipline winner Anna Fenninger of Austria suffered a season-ending (and career-threatening) injury, and 2013 discipline winner Tina Maze of Slovenia took the entire 2015–16 season off to determine if she wanted to continue with her career.

The crystal globe for the season then developed into a battle between 2015 runner-up Eva-Maria Brem, also of Austria, and two-time (2011–12) discipline champion Viktoria Rebensburg of Germany.  After winning the next-to-last race of the season in Jasná, Brem opened a 52-point lead over Rebensburg, meaning that as long as she finished no worse than fourth in the finals in St. Moritz, Brem would win the championship no matter what Rebensburg did. And that was exactly what happened, as Rebensburg stormed through the last run of the giant slalom at finals for a commanding victory, but Brem, running last, barely managed to hold onto fourth by 0.03 seconds to win the season championship by two points (592 to 590).

Standings

DNF1 = Did Not Finish run 1
DSQ1 = Disqualified run 1
DNQ = Did Not Qualify for run 2
DNF2 = Did Not Finish run 2
DSQ2 = Disqualified run 2
DNS = Did Not Start

See also
 2016 Alpine Skiing World Cup – Women's summary rankings
 2016 Alpine Skiing World Cup – Women's Overall
 2016 Alpine Skiing World Cup – Women's Downhill
 2016 Alpine Skiing World Cup – Women's Super-G
 2016 Alpine Skiing World Cup – Women's Slalom
 2016 Alpine Skiing World Cup – Women's Combined

References

External links
 Alpine Skiing at FIS website

Women's Giant Slalom
FIS Alpine Ski World Cup women's giant slalom discipline titles